Plaka is a village located in the Apokoronas region of the northwest coast of the island of Crete, Greece. It is located in Chania regional unit. Plaka is two kilometres from Almirida, a resort which it overlooks. Situated high up the hill there are views over the Mediterranean Sea.

External links

Populated places in Chania (regional unit)